Luigi Galvani (also ; ; ; 9 September 1737 – 4 December 1798) was an Italian physician, physicist, biologist and philosopher, who studied animal electricity. In 1780, he discovered that the muscles of dead frogs' legs twitched when struck by an electrical spark. This was an early study of bioelectricity, following experiments by John Walsh and Hugh Williamson.

Early life 

Luigi Galvani was born to Domenico Galvani and Barbara Caterina Foschi, in Bologna, then part of the Papal States. Domenico was a goldsmith.

Galvani then began taking an interest in the field of "medical electricity".

Galvani vs. Volta

Alessandro Volta, a professor of experimental physics in the University of Pavia, was among the first scientists who repeated and checked Galvani’s experiments. At first, he embraced animal electricity. However, he started to doubt that the conductions were caused by specific electricity intrinsic to the animal's legs or other body parts. Volta believed that the contractions depended on the metal cable Galvani used to connect the nerves and muscles in his experiments.

Every cell has a cell potential; biological electricity has the same chemical underpinnings as the current between electrochemical cells, and thus can be duplicated outside the body. Volta's intuition was correct.  Volta, essentially, objected to Galvani’s conclusions about "animal electric fluid", but the two scientists disagreed respectfully and Volta coined the term "Galvanism" for a direct current of electricity produced by chemical action.

Since Galvani was reluctant to intervene in the controversy with Volta, he trusted his nephew, Giovanni Aldini, to act as the main defender of the theory of animal electricity.

Death
Galvani actively investigated animal electricity until the end of his life. The  Cisalpine Republic, a French client state founded in 1797 after the French occupation of Northern Italy, required every university professor to swear loyalty to the new authority. Galvani, who disagreed with the social and political confusion, refused to swear loyalty, along with other colleagues. This led to the new authority depriving him of all his academic and public positions, which took every financial support away. Galvani died peacefully surrounded by his mother and father, in his brother’s house depressed and in poverty, on 4 December 1798.

Legacy
Galvani's legacy includes:
 Galvani's report of his investigations were mentioned specifically by Mary Shelley as part of the summer reading list leading up to an ad hoc ghost story contest on a rainy day in Switzerland—and the resultant novel Frankenstein—and its reanimated construct.  In Frankenstein, Victor studies the principles of galvanism but it is not mentioned in reference to the creation of the Monster.
 Galvani's name also survives in everyday language as the verb 'galvanize' as well as in more specialized terms: Galvani potential, galvanic anode, galvanic bath, galvanic cell, galvanic corrosion, galvanic couple, galvanic current, galvanic isolation, galvanic series, galvanic skin response, galvanism, galvanization, hot-dip galvanization, galvanometer, Galvalume®, and psycho-galvanic reflex.

Galvani, according to William Fox, was "by nature courageous and religious." Jean-Louis-Marc Alibert said of Galvani that he never ended his lessons “without exhorting his hearers and leading them back to the idea of that eternal Providence, which develops, conserves, and circulates life among so many diverse beings.”

Works
 De viribus electricitatis in motu musculari commentarius , 1791. The Institute of Sciences, Bologna.

See also
History of electrochemistry

References

Sources

External links

 
 

1737 births
1798 deaths
Physicians from Bologna
University of Bologna alumni
Academic staff of the University of Bologna
18th-century Italian physicians
18th-century Latin-language writers
18th-century Italian male writers
History of neuroscience
Battery inventors
People of the Papal States
Italian Roman Catholics